This is a list of cricketers who have played first-class, List A or Twenty20 cricket for Northern Punjab cricket team. Seasons given are first and last seasons; the player did not necessarily play in all the intervening seasons. Players in bold have played international cricket.

C
Ramesh Chadha, 1961/62
B
Bishan Singh Bedi, 1961/62 - 1966/67

D
Dwarak Das, 1963/64

K
LK Kandhari, 1966/67

M
Kenneth Mackessack, 1926/27

V
Ramesh Verma, 1965/66

Northern Punjab cricketers